Graham Iefvion Burgess (born 5 May 1943) is a former first-class cricketer who made over 450 appearances for Somerset County Cricket Club between 1966 and 1980. A right-arm medium pace bowler and a right-handed lower middle-order hitter, Burgess is described by Cricinfo as "a good old-fashioned county professional". After his retirement from professional cricket, Burgess qualified as a first-class umpire, and stood in over 500 county cricket matches between 1990 and 2008, when he retired. He also umpired a number of international matches, including Youth Test matches, Youth One Day Internationals and Women's One Day Internationals.

Early career
An education at Millfield School helped to steer all-round sportsman Burgess to a career in cricket. Although the Somerset side at the time was not known for signing local talent, earning it a tag of 'a team of all nations', Burgess became an exception. He appeared for Somerset Second XI regularly between 1963 and 1966, impressing with both bat and ball. He made his debut for the first-team in a match against the touring West Indians in July 1966, and the step-up proved tough. Burgess recorded scores of 1 and 35 with the bat as Somerset followed-on, and opening the bowling, he finished with figures of 0/101. Despite his unimpressive entrance into first-class cricket, Burgess was selected for the County Championship match against Lancashire the day after the conclusion of the West Indians match. Not asked to bowl by his captain, Burgess was free to concentrate solely on his batting, and put on a 145 run partnership for the sixth wicket with Ken Palmer to help Somerset to recover from 29/5. Burgess claimed his first wicket in county cricket during a Gillette Cup match against Warwickshire in early August, a match that was also his List A debut. Burgess finished his first season with 406 runs from 21 innings at an average of 20.30 in first-class cricket.

Later career

Burgess continued to play for Somerset in first-class cricket until 1979 and in limited-over cricket until 1982.  The closing stages of his career coincided with increasing success for the county as he played alongside Viv Richards, Ian Botham, Joel Garner, Brian Rose and Vic Marks as the club achieved its first major honours.  He was part of the team in 1979 which won, on successive days, the Gillette Cup, and the John Player League.  Burgess contributed in Somerset's run to the former, top-scoring with 50 not out in the quarter-final against Kent, and taking 3 for 25 in the semi-final against Middlesex.

References

External links
 
 

Living people
1943 births
People from Glastonbury
English cricketers
Somerset cricketers
Wiltshire cricketers
Minor Counties cricketers
Cambridgeshire cricketers
English cricket umpires
People educated at Millfield